The Brambles Farm Peace Camp was a peace camp set up in the Spring of 1982 on farmland at Waterlooville, Hampshire by local residents and peace campaigners to protest at and to disrupt the planned construction of a torpedo factory on the site. The demonstrators occupied the land for 10 weeks before being evicted in September of that year. The site was soon re-occupied for a short time although this was short-lived and the peace camp folded soon after. The Torpedo Town Festival was born out of the camp and was held at various locations, wandering from Hampshire to as far away as Wales, until the early nineties.

References 

Peace organisations based in the United Kingdom
Anti-war protests
Peace camps
1982 establishments in England